Jersey Guy is a 2003 American comedy-drama film directed by Elia Zois and starring Steve Parlavecchio, Arthur J. Nascarella and Stacie Mistysyn.

Plot

Cast
Steve Parlavecchio as Jack
Arthur J. Nascarella as Father
Ralph Caputo as Merle
Stacie Mistysyn as Susan
Tom Borillo as George
Jill Wolfe as Samantha

Production
The film was shot in 2000.

Reception
The film has a 0% rating on Rotten Tomatoes.

References

External links
 
 

American comedy-drama films
2000s English-language films
2000s American films